Old Rectory or The Old Rectory may refer to:

United Kingdom

England
The Old Rectory, Chidham, West Sussex
Gawsworth Old Rectory, Cheshire
Redmarshall Old Rectory, County Durham
Old Rectory, Warton, Lancashire
The Old Rectory, Yatton, Somerset
The Old Rectory, St Columb Major, Cornwall
The Old Rectory, Himley, Staffordshire
Ellys Manor House, also known as The Old Rectory, Great Ponton, Lincolnshire

Wales
St Fagans Old Rectory, Cardiff

Isle of Man
The Old Rectory, Andreas Village, one of Isle of Man's Registered Buildings

United States
Old Rectory (Perrowville, Virginia), Bedford County, Virginia

See also
Rectory